The Ill-gotten Party Assets Settlement Committee (CIPAS) is an independent government agency of the Republic of China established in 2016. It is responsible for the investigation and returning of ill-gotten assets of political parties and their affiliated organizations during the martial law period in Taiwan. All parties established before the lifting of martial law, 15 July 1987, are required to report their party assets to the committee. As the dominant party during the martial law period, the Kuomintang (KMT) and its affiliate organizations are the main targets of this investigation. The council is headquartered in Zhongshan District, Taipei.

History
The Act Governing the Handling of Ill-gotten Properties by Political Parties and Their Affiliate Organizations was passed in July 2016 and Wellington Koo, one of the main authors of the Act, was named as the committee chairman in August. He stepped down from the Legislative Yuan to take the appointment. Koo assumed the committee chairmanship despite the Kuomintang citing Article 20 of the Act, which requires nonpartisan committee members, in its objections to Koo's leadership. Koo named most of the committee members on 24 August, and the group was officially established on 31 August. With the establishment of the committee, the KMT has insisted that it has been illegally and unconstitutionally persecuted and that the investigation is a political witch hunt. However, the ruling Democratic Progressive Party (DPP) maintained that the means are necessary for achieving transitional justice and leveling the playing field for all political parties. In September 2017 Koo left the chairman post and was succeeded by Lin Feng-cheng. On 28 August 2020, the Constitutional Court ruled that the committee was constitutional.

Determinations and resulting actions

The committee has made several determinations.
 On August 7, 2018, the China Youth Corps (CYC) was determined to be an affiliated youth organization of the KMT.  Its assets, valued at $5.6 billion NTD, were subsequently frozen, and the organization was required to declare its properties to the committee within four months.  The CYC responded to the ruling arguing that it ceased to be a governmental organization in 1969.
 On October 9, 2018, the Central Motion Picture Corp. (CMPC) was determined to be an affiliate of the KMT, as the organization's official documents bore the words "party-run enterprise."  The committee also argued that the Central Investment Holding Co., a KMT-owned enterprise, sold 82.5% of the CMPC's shares to KMT member Alex Tsai at below market value.  The corporation's assets, valued at $11.8 billion NTD, were frozen.
 On March 19. 2019, the National Women's League (NWL) was determined to be an affiliate of the KMT.  The organization was founded by Soong Mei-ling in 1950 to care for military families.  The organization is set to forfeit most of its assets, valued at $38 billion NTD.  The committee found that the KMT had helped the NWL obtain funding through a surcharge on imports over a period of 30 years, amounting to a total of $24 billion NTD.  The NWL is challenging the determination in court.
 On September 1, 2019, the Committee determined that the KMT appropriated its first group of properties from the ROC government in April 1947, a package of 85 properties around Taiwan, many of which were later sold to private parties.
 On September 24, 2019, the Committee determined that the Broadcasting Corporation of China (BCC) was an affiliate of the KMT, ordering it to relinquish its 13 parcels of real estate to the state and pay $7.7 billion NTD in compensation for assets transferred to third parties or bought back by the government.  The BCC had been sold to holding companies owned by chairman Jaw Shaw-kong in 2006 though via KMT-owned Hua Hsia Investment Holding Co.
 On February 18, 2020, the Committee held a hearing to determine whether three KMT properties should be considered ill-gotten.
 On April 26, 2020, the committee seized the balance of funds originally held by the Chinese Association for Relief and Ensuing Services, founded in 1961 by Chiang Kai-shek for hunger relief in China, which had closed in 2002 with a balance of $34.25 million NTD.  The funds had been transferred to a private account in 2004.  The committee held a hearing to determine whether the associated was affiliated with the KMT, and whether its funds were ill-gotten.  The committee maintains that the relief efforts were government-driven, with the association merely responsible for management, and therefore did not have rights to the funds.
 On April 27, 2020, the National Women's League was official dissolved.  The League was given an option to become a political party, which it refused, and is still suing the government over the freezing of its funds.

Chairpersons

See also 

 List of assets owned by the Kuomintang
 Transitional Justice Commission

References

External links 

Ill-gotten Party Assets Settlement Committee website (Chinese)

2016 establishments in Taiwan
Executive Yuan
Government agencies established in 2016
Kuomintang
Asset management